David Michayluk (born May 18, 1962) is a Canadian former professional ice hockey right winger who played 21 games in the National Hockey League (NHL) with the Philadelphia Flyers and Pittsburgh Penguins. He was a member of Pittsburgh's 1992 Stanley Cup championship team despite playing his only seven games in a Penguins uniform during the 1992 Stanley Cup playoffs.

Career statistics

Awards
WHL Rookie of the Year (1981)
WHL Second All-Star Team (1981 & 1982)
IHL Second All-Star Team (1985, 1992, 1993)
IHL First All-Star Team (1987, 1988, 1989, 1990)
Leo P. Lamoureux Memorial Trophy (Leading Scorer - IHL) (1989)
James Gatschene Memorial Trophy (MVP - IHL) (1989)
Norman R. "Bud" Poile Trophy (Playoff MVP - IHL) (1989)
1992 Stanley Cup Championship  (Pittsburgh)
Ironman Award (Played every game - IHL) (1992, 1993)

External links
 

1962 births
Living people
Canadian expatriate ice hockey players in the United States
Canadian ice hockey right wingers
Canadian people of Ukrainian descent
Cleveland Lumberjacks players
Hershey Bears players
Ice hockey people from Saskatchewan
Kalamazoo Wings (1974–2000) players
Maine Mariners players
Muskegon Lumberjacks players
Nova Scotia Oilers players
People from Wakaw, Saskatchewan
Philadelphia Flyers draft picks
Philadelphia Flyers players
Pittsburgh Penguins players
Prince Albert Raiders (SJHL) players
Regina Pats players
Springfield Indians players
Stanley Cup champions